Peddamanagalaram is a village in Ranga Reddy district, Telangana, India. It comes under Moinabad (mandal). The village is the birthplace of former Deputy Chief Minister Konda Venkata Ranga Reddy (the district was named after him), former Chief Minister Marri Chenna Reddy, former MLA Sri Chirag Pratap Lingam Goud, former MLA Konda Laxma Reddy

Education
There is a Zilla Parishad High School in the village as well as Azad College of Engineering and Technology.

Transport
The state-run TSRTC connects the village to Hyderabad and other towns and villages.

References

External links
Transport timetable

Villages in Ranga Reddy district